Americus Township is a township in Lyon County, Kansas, United States.

History
Americus Township was founded in 1857.

References

Townships in Lyon County, Kansas
Townships in Kansas
1857 establishments in Kansas Territory